"S.L.U.T." (an acronym for "sweet, little, unforgettable thing") is a song by American singer Bea Miller. Hollywood Records released it on October 6, 2017 as a single for her third extended play (EP) Chapter Three: Yellow (2017). It also serves as the second single for her second studio album Aurora (2018).

In popular culture
"S.L.U.T." was included in the song list of the video game Just Dance 2019 (2018). The song's title was expanded to "Sweet Little Unforgettable Thing" in the game, likely to be more kid-friendly.

“S.L.U.T.” is used as the outro song for the Barstool Sports podcast Schnitt Talk.

The song was used in a season 1 episode of the Netflix series Ginny & Georgia.

Composition and lyrics
"S.L.U.T." is a song about female empowerment. In an interview with Teen Vogue, Miller said that she was inspired to write the song when someone commented on a picture she posted of herself to slut-shame her. 
Miller's co-writer looked up the word 'slut' on the Urban Dictionary and one of the definitions defined it as an acronym for "Sweet, little, unforgettable thing". Miller thought that women feel better hearing this and said that "when women are called a slut for absolutely no reason", the song will make them feel better about themselves.

Music video
The music video for "S.L.U.T." was released on January 18, 2018.

Credits and personnel
Credits adapted from Tidal.
Bea Miller – composer, lyricist
Ido Zmishlany – producer, composer, lyricist, associated performer, background vocalist, engineer, studio personnel
Steph Jones – composer, lyricist, associated performer, background vocalist, 
Todd Norman – assistant recording engineer, studio personnel
James Royo – mixer, studio personnel

References

External links
 

2017 singles
2017 songs
Hollywood Records singles
Bea Miller songs
Songs written by Ido Zmishlany
Songs written by Steph Jones
Songs written by Bea Miller